Dambrowka Lock, Dąbrówka Lock - Seventeenth lock on the Augustów Canal (from the Biebrza). Built in 1829 by George Arnold. The second of the three locks lying on the territory of Belarus. It was renovated in the years 2005 - 2006 and functions as a shipping facility.

 Location: 91.5 km channel
 Level difference: 3.04 m
 Length: 43.9 m
 Width: 6.10 m
 Gates: Wooden
 Year built: 1829
 Construction Manager: Jerzy Arnold

References

 
 
 

19th-century establishments in Belarus
Locks of Belarus